Frederick Cecil Mills (March 24, 1892 – February 9, 1964) was an American economist. He was a professor of economics at Columbia University in Manhattan from 1919 to 1959. An expert on business cycles, he was also a researcher at the National Bureau of Economic Research from 1925 to 1953. In 1940, he served as president of the American Economic Association. Mills was named a Fellow of the American Statistical Association in 1926.

His son, Robert Mills, was a physicist known for the development of Yang–Mills theory.

Bibliography

References

External links 
 

1892 births
1964 deaths
People from Santa Rosa, California
Economists from California
University of California, Berkeley alumni
Columbia University alumni
Columbia University faculty
Presidents of the American Economic Association
Fellows of the American Statistical Association
Fellows of the Econometric Society
20th-century American economists